Fernando López Miras (born 4 October 1983) is a Spanish politician from the People's Party and President of the Region of Murcia since May 2017. Second López Miras Government of Murcia

References

1983 births
Presidents of the Region of Murcia
Members of the Regional Assembly of Murcia
People's Party (Spain) politicians
Living people